Assisting in activities of daily living (ADL) are skills required in nursing and other professions such as nursing assistants.

Personal assistance is waged support of 20 or more hours a week for people with impairments. A 2008 review reported that  personal assistance is possibly beneficial to some older people and their informal carers. Further research is needed to assess which models of personal assistant are more efficient, as well as their relative total costs.

Doctors and nurses need to understand and learn about each patient's character and remember that illness often changes the patient's psyche: reactions to others change, often he or she becomes fussy, capricious, etc. It takes patience, tact, concentration, discipline and care to reach out to the patient, to gain their trust and to maintain their confidence in recovery and success of the treatment. In addition to morale, it is necessary to look after how one looks. Clothes should be clean, ironed, neat, hair tidied, hands clean, nails trimmed, moderate use of cosmetics, perfume and jewellery. In many health care facilities, special uniforms have been introduced. Due to the fact that nursing care requires a lot of attention and energy, nursing staff usually take additional courses based on practical data, such as NCLEX. Nursing care is usually divided into general and special care. Particular difficulties arise when caring for the severely ill.

Mobility

Inactive patients must be turned every two hours, which is the minimum time that a bed sore can develop. To move a bedridden patient to the side, the patient is first pulled closer to the opposite side that they are turning to give room to maneuver. When the patient is turned to the side, a pillow is usually placed to the back to support that position.

A pillow is often placed at the head of the bed to protect the head from any injury when moving a bedridden patient up in bed. Often the patient is turned to one side at a time to place a friction reducing sheet under the patient. When moving up, the patient is asked to bend knees and push with their legs while their chin is to their chest to prevent neck injury. The patient is pulled up either by the friction reducing sheet or draw sheet.

Some of the benefits of mobility among hospitalized patients are - deep vein thrombosis, decreasing pressure ulcers and functional decline.

Hygiene

Bathing
For a bed bath, a bath blanket is put over the patient and only the area washed is exposed at a time for privacy and warmth. To make a mitt out of a washcloth, the fingers and palm of the dominant hand are placed over the washcloth and the washcloth is folded over the fingers and palm. The remaining part of the washcloth not covering the fingers and palms will be folded over and tucked in and the thumb will be out of the mitt.

The eyes are cleaned, usually first, without soap to avoid irritation. The eye is cleaned from the inner side near the nose to the outer edge to avoid carrying debris to the tear duct. The cloth is rinsed or turned before going to the other eye to prevent spreading any organisms. Each area is dried at a time before washing the next area. For perineal care, the perineum is washed from least contaminated to most contaminated to reduce the spread of microorganisms. For females, the labia is spread and washed from the pubic area toward the anal area and not the other way around. For males, the tip of the penis is cleaned first and cleaned away from the meatus. In an uncircumcised penis, the foreskin is retracted and immediately put back in place to avoid compromising circulation and the foreskin is not retracted for children in order to prevent injury.

Toileting

A bedpan is used for bed-bound patients for bowel elimination as well urinary elimination for females. Powder is often placed along the ring of the bedpan to help reduce friction but is avoided if contraindicated by issues like allergies or if a stool sample is needed. Raising the head of the bed assists in voiding or defecating.

Dressing
For those with a weaker side (such as from strokes), the arm on the stronger side is used to dress the weaker side first. When undressing, the arm or leg on the stronger side is pulled out first.

The types of wound dressing are hydrocolloid dressings, hydrogel, alginate, 
collagen, foam, transparent and cloth.

Bedmaking

A fitted sheet goes over the mattress. Often a draw sheet, also called lift sheet, is used, where it is placed over the fitted sheet and in the center where it will be under the patient's midsection. By lifting the draw sheet, it is used to help move the patient. The fitted sheet and draw sheet, which are those that go under the patient, are firmly tucked in to prevent wrinkles, which can promote skin breakdown. A top sheet and blanket are often placed over the bed and the corners are mitered.

When making an occupied bed, such as for patients who are unable or have difficulty getting out of bed, one side of the bed is made at a time. Usually, the patient rolls to one side and the old linen under the patient from the opposite side, such as the fitted sheet and draw sheet, is untucked and rolled as close to the patient as possible. The new fitted sheet and draw sheet are then tucked in and also rolled close toward the patient. Then the patient rolls back toward the other side. The old linen that was folded under the patient is removed and the new linen that was also folded under the patient is eased out to make the other side of the bed. For those for whom it is contraindicated to roll to the side, such as those recovering from hip replacement surgery, then the patient sits up in bed while the top half of the bed is made and afterward the bottom half of the bed is made.

Feeding
To maintain self-esteem, the person is involved as much as possible. His or her preferences are asked regarding the order of items eaten. Condiments are added and food cut according to patient preferences. Dentures, hearing aids or glasses are put in place before mealtime.

Some points to remember when feeding a helpless patient are placing the patients in a comfortable position for eating. Oral hygiene is important after eating. Examples of oral hygiene for patients are brushing the teeth, cleaning the dentures and using mouth wash. Allow patients to have sufficient time to swallow food before forcing in another mouthful. Sufficient liquid with the meal can also be provided. Make sure not to leave the patient until their appetite is satisfied. Give patients a choice of food. Wash patient's hands and face after feeding.

Swallowing precautions
For those with dysphagia, the patient has placed on aspiration (choking) precautions. The rate of feeding and size of bites are adjusted to the patient's tolerance. The diet would be modified according to the nutrition consult, such as chopping, mincing, pureeing or thickening liquids because they are easier to swallow than thin liquids. Solids and liquids are alternated to help with swallowing. The patient ideally sits upright and tucks the chin towards the chest during swallowing to help prevent aspiration. Signs of aspiration include coughing, choking, cyanosis, voice changes and regurgitation. A 30-minute rest period prior to mealtime is provided to give less difficulty with swallowing.

Visually impaired
For visually impaired patients, using a clock face analogy to relate the position of items is common. It is recommended to place foods and dishes in a similar location at each meal for familiarity. For a beverage, straws are used when possible, if not contradicted by dysphagia, in order to prevent spilling.

Suicide precautions
For those on suicide precautions, food is served in plastic or paper containers with plastic utensils (no knives) and sharp items should only be used only with continual staff supervision.

See also
Nursing

References

Nursing
Caregiving
Self-care